Wakefield Ladies Football Club is an English women's football club based in Wakefield, West Yorkshire. The club currently play in the North East Regional Women's Football League Southern Division and the Women's FA Cup.

References

External links
Official site
Twitter Page 

Women's football clubs in England
Wakefield